Turnersburg or Turnersburgh can refer to any of several places in the United States:

Turnersburg, North Carolina
Turnersburg Township, Iredell County, North Carolina
Turnersburgh, Vermont - the former name of Chelsea, Vermont